James Alexander MacDonald (October 1858 – December 20, 1939) was a lawyer, judge and political figure in British Columbia. He represented Rossland City in the Legislative Assembly of British Columbia from 1903 to 1909 as a Liberal. MacDonald was the first leader of the British Columbia Liberal Party, serving from 1903 until 1909.

He was born in Huron County, Ontario and was educated in Stratford, Ontario, at the University of Toronto and at Osgoode Hall. MacDonald first set up practice in Toronto in 1890 and then moved to Rossland, British Columbia in 1896. He married Mary Richardson. In 1909, he was named Chief Justice in the British Columbia Court of Appeal. MacDonald served as Chief Justice of the British Columbia Supreme Court from 1929 until his retirement in 1937. He died two years later in Victoria at the age of 81.

References 

1858 births
1939 deaths
British Columbia Liberal Party MLAs
Leaders of the British Columbia Liberal Party
University of Toronto alumni
Judges in British Columbia
Lawyers in British Columbia